Sunil Chaturvedi (born 5 July 1961) is an Indian cricketer. He played in 72 first-class and 16 List A matches for Uttar Pradesh from 1979/80 to 1991/92.

See also
 List of Uttar Pradesh cricketers

References

External links
 

1961 births
Living people
Indian cricketers
Uttar Pradesh cricketers
Sportspeople from Kanpur